Athyma kanwa, the dot-dash sergeant, is a species of brush-footed butterfly found in tropical and subtropical Asia and Cambodia.

References
 
 
 Savela, Markku (2007). Lepidoptera and Some Other Life Forms: Athyma. Version of 9 March 2007. Retrieved 8 September 2007.
 

K
Butterflies of Indochina
Butterflies of Asia
Butterflies of Singapore
Butterflies described in 1858